The seventh Plenary Assembly of the Parliament of Catalonia was in session between 2003 and 2006. There were 135 deputies: 46 from the CiU, 42 from the PSC, 23 from the ERC, 15 from the PPC, and 9 from the ICV-EUiA.

References 

Parliament of Catalonia